John A. MacIsaac (August 1883 – June 1, 1942) was a Canadian politician. He represented the electoral district of Antigonish in the Nova Scotia House of Assembly from 1941 to 1942. He was a member of the Nova Scotia Liberal Party.

MacIsaac was born in 1883 at Broad Cove Banks, Inverness County, Nova Scotia. He married Mary Catherine MacDonald in 1916. MacIsaac entered provincial politics in the 1941 election, winning the Antigonish riding by over 1000 votes. MacIsaac died in office on June 1, 1942.

References

1883 births
1942 deaths
Nova Scotia Liberal Party MLAs
People from Inverness County, Nova Scotia